Percy John Daniell (9 January 1889 – 25 May 1946) was a pure and applied mathematician.

Early life and education

Daniell was born in Valparaiso, Chile. His family returned to England in 1895. Daniell attended King Edward's School, Birmingham and proceeded to Trinity College, Cambridge (where he was the last  Senior Wrangler in 1909). At this time Daniell was an applied mathematician/theoretical physicist.

Mathematical career

For a year he lectured at the University of Liverpool and then he was appointed to the new Rice Institute in Houston, Texas. The Rice Institute had him spend a year  at the University of Göttingen studying with Max Born and David Hilbert. Daniell was at Rice from 1914 to 1923 when he returned to England to a chair at the University of Sheffield.

In a series of papers published between 1918 and 1928, he developed and expanded a generalized theory of integration and differentiation, which is today known as the Daniell integral. In the setting of integration, he also worked on results that lead to the Daniell-Kolmogorov extension theorem  in the theory of stochastic processes, independently of Andrey Kolmogorov. He was an Invited Speaker of the ICM in 1920 at Strasbourg.

Death

During World War II Daniell advised the British Ministry of Supply. The strain of work during the war took a heavy toll on his health. He died on 25 May 1946, after having collapsed at his home a few weeks earlier.

External links 

Aldrich, J. (2007) "But you have to remember P.J.Daniell of Sheffield" Electronic Journ@l for History of Probability and Statistics December 2007.

References 

 Stewart, C.A. (1947), "P. J. Daniell", J. London Math. Soc. s1-22: 75–80.
 Daniell, Percy John (1918), "A general form of integral", Annals of Mathematics 19: 279–94.
 –––––– (1919a), "Integrals in an infinite number of dimensions", Annals of Mathematics 20: 281–88.
 –––––– (1919b), "Functions of limited variation in an infinite number of dimensions", Annals of Mathematics 21: 30–38.
 –––––– (1920), "Further properties of the general integral", Annals of Mathematics 21: 203–20.
 –––––– (1921), "Integral products and probability", American Journal of Mathematics 43: 143–62.
 –––––– (1946), "Discussion on the Symposium on Autocorrelation in Time Series", Supplement to the Journal of the Royal Statistical Society 8-1: 88–90.
 Shilov, G. E., and Gurevich, B. L. (1978), Integral, Measure, and Derivative: A Unified Approach, Richard A. Silverman, trans., Dover Publications. 

1889 births
1946 deaths
University of Göttingen alumni
Rice University faculty
20th-century British mathematicians
Alumni of Trinity College, Cambridge
Senior Wranglers
People from Valparaíso
People educated at King Edward's School, Birmingham
British expatriates in Chile
British expatriates in the United States